Edward Holmes Baldock (1812 – 15 August 1875) was a British Conservative Party politician. He was the son of Edward Holmes Baldock (dealer) (1777–1845), the prominent London dealer in French 18th-century furniture and reproductions.

He was elected at the 1847 general election as a Member of Parliament (MP) for the borough of Shrewsbury, and was re-elected in 1852. He did not contest the 1857 general election.

References

External links 
 

1812 births
1875 deaths
Conservative Party (UK) MPs for English constituencies
UK MPs 1847–1852
UK MPs 1852–1857